View of the Cannaregio Canal was painted by  Francesco Guardi  around 1770. It is a small oil on canvas painting measuring 48.9 × 77.5 cm. It now hangs in the reading room of the Frick Art Reference Library alongside  the Regatta in Venice. Both paintings were gifted to the Frick Collection by Helen Clay Frick after her father's death. In the painting, Guardi captures a typical scene of Venetian life on the canals. In this particular veduta, Guardi depicts a section of the northern bank of the Cannaregio Canal, one of Venice’s largest canals, located in the Cannaregio sestiere (district) of the city.

The Palazzo Surian Bellotto is the most prominent building in the painting, named after the two different families who owned the palace: first the Surian family and then the Bellotto family.

The Ponte dei Tre Archi connects the northern bank with the small fragment of the southern bank. The bridge’s arch acts as a viewfinder, focusing the viewer’s gaze onto the tiny patch of pure blue, breaking up the otherwise entirely urban landscape.

Another building that features in this view is the Santa Maria delle Penitenti. It is recognizable by its circular window below the roof and placement behind the Ponte dei Tre Archi. This church was designed by Giorgio Massari in 1725 and the façade was never completed. Guardi takes care to ensure its recognizability despite its modest appearance.

References

External links

1770 paintings
Paintings by Francesco Guardi
Paintings in the Frick Collection
Cityscape paintings of Venice